The 2013 European Short Course Swimming Championships took place in Herning, Denmark, from 12 to 15 December 2013.

Results

Men's events

Legend: WR – World record; WBT – World best time; ER – European record; CR – Championship record

Vitaly Melnikov originally won silver, but following his disqualification for doping offences, the medals in the event were upgraded.

Women's events

Legend: WR – World record; WBT – World best time; ER – European record; CR – Championship record

Mixed events

Medal table

On 13 May 2014 Russian swimmer Yuliya Yefimova was officially suspended for doping use and lost 4 gold and 1 silver medals. Another Russian swimmer Vitaly Melnikov was banned in May 2015, which resulted in a loss of an individual silver and two relay gold medals for Russia.

Participating nations
559 swimmers from 42 countries swam at the 2013 edition.

 (12)
 (0)
 (13)
 (17)
 (2)
 (2)
 (13)
 (2)
 (22)
 (29)
 (16)
 (7)
 (19)
 (44)
 (0)
 (31)
 (12)
 (4)
 (26)
 (6)
 (6)
 (11)
 (34)
 (3)
 (2)
 (11)
 (8)
 (1)
 (0)
 (19)
 (9)
 (15)
 (8)
 (37)
 (13)
 (10)
 (11)
 (12)
 (33)
 (11)
 (12)
 (16)

References

External links

Results book 

2013
European Short Course Swimming Championships
European Short Course Swimming Championships
2013 European Short Course Swimming Championships
Swimming competitions in Denmark
Sport in Herning
December 2013 sports events in Europe